Meiacanthus mossambicus, the Mozambique fangblenny, is a species of combtooth blenny found in coral reefs in the western Indian ocean where it is known to occur off the coast of eastern Africa as well as Madagascar and the Comoro Islands.  This species grows to a length of  TL.  This species is also found in the aquarium trade.

References

mossambicus
Fish described in 1959